Meet Market Adventures is a North American company specializing in singles events and socializing opportunities.  The company's name is a play on the phrase "meat market".

The company hosts events for single young professionals interested in meeting new people. Unlike a dating company that aims for romantic matches, the company objective is for singles to have somewhere they can meet people who share similar interests.
Along with local activities, the company organises singles vacations. Favorite events include pub crawls, Whirlyball, and chocolate making. They also host regular parties on New Year's Eve and Valentine's Day, among other times.

Company information 
The company was founded by Travis Hartley in Toronto, Ontario in 2000, and hosted their first event in September of that year. Event scheduling began slowly, with no more than 2 events each month, but quickly grew. Within the next five years the company was hosting over 30 events monthly, and had over 30,000 registered members.

The company expanded, branching out of Toronto and into New York. By 2007, the company had franchises operating in twelve cities across the United States and Canada, with further plans for expansion.

Collectively, the franchises have over 70,000 members and claim to be "the most active singles sports, social and outdoor company in North America."

In 2011 the company began marketing to single parents.

References

Organizations based in Toronto
Social planning websites